HE Ruben James Kun (30 March 1942 – 21 September 2014) was a political figure from the Pacific nation of Nauru and was president of the Republic of Nauru.

Early career
Kun was a lawyer before becoming a political figure.

He was the minister assisting the president of Nauru in the cabinets of Lagumot Harris in 1978 and 1995–1996. He was the speaker of the Parliament of Nauru from August 1981 to December 1986.

He was Minister of Finance under Bernard Dowiyogo and Lagumot Harris from January 1978 to May 1978, and again in the cabinet of Lagumot Harris from November 1995 to November 1996.

President of Nauru
Kun succeeded Kennan Adeang as president of Nauru from 19 December 1996 to 13 February 1997, and was succeeded by Kinza Clodumar.

Post-presidency
Kun was again Minister of Finance under Bernard Dowiyogo from August 1998 to December 1998. Under the Pacific Solution asylum policy, Australia has an arrangement with Nauru that allows asylum seekers arriving in Australia to be detained on the island. Kun represented detainees in a case before the nation's Supreme Court.

See also
 Politics of Nauru

References

Speakers of the Parliament of Nauru
Members of the Parliament of Nauru
Presidents of Nauru
Finance Ministers of Nauru
People from Buada District
1942 births
2014 deaths
Government ministers of Nauru
Ministers Assisting the President of Nauru
20th-century Nauruan politicians